Blue Cross is a registered animal welfare charity in the United Kingdom, founded in 1897. The charity provides veterinary care, offers expert behavioural help, and finds homes for pets in need.  Their pet bereavement service supports those who are struggling to cope with the loss of a much-loved pet.

The charity works closely with a number of other organisations to help animal welfare and responsible pet ownership.

History

The organisation was founded on 10 May 1897 in London as Our Dumb Friends League, to care for working horses on the streets of the British capital. It opened its first animal hospital, in Victoria, London, on 15 May 1906.

In 1912, the league launched The Blue Cross Fund to care for horses during the Balkan War. On the outbreak of the First World War in 1914, it was quickly reopened again. By the armistice in 1918, the Blue Cross Fund had raised nearly £170,000 – the equivalent of almost £6.5 million today – to care for the animals of conflict. Over 50,000 horses were treated in Blue Cross hospitals in France, and the charity had sent vital veterinary supplies to 3,500 units of the British Army.

Donations to the Fund enabled the charity to care for more than 350,000 animals during the Second World War, many of who were wounded during the Blitz.
The name of the appeal fund became more widely known than the official charity title and the league officially changed its name to "The Blue Cross" in 1950. In 2011 the charity dropped "The" from its name and is now simply known as "Blue Cross."

Sally de la Bedoyere became the charity's CEO in November 2014. In June 2020, Chris Burghes joined Blue Cross as CEO.

Operations

Blue Cross operates a number of services throughout the United Kingdom.  Its major services are: rehoming unwanted animals, providing veterinary services to pet owners who cannot afford the private fees charged by private veterinary surgeons, promoting animal welfare through education, and operating the Pet Bereavement Support Service, a free and confidential support line for those who have lost a pet.  They also operate a horse ambulance service, including at large equestrian events.

Blue Cross operates four animal hospitals, three of which are in London, at Victoria, Merton and Hammersmith, and a fourth in Grimsby, Lincolnshire,. In 2014 it opened a pet care clinic in Derby, and has since opened a further four.  Blue Cross carried out over 97,000 treatments, operations and diagnostic investigations in 2010.

Blue Cross is also heavily involved in animal adoption, arranging adoption for companion animals such as cats, dogs, rabbits and small rodents, as well as larger species such as horses.  In 2015, the charity's rehoming team helped 9,160 animals and its veterinary team helped 29,549 animals.

The organisation also works to improve the lives of animals through promotion to pet owners and work in animal behaviour therapy. Every pet owner that rehomes a pet through the charity can benefit from free behaviour advice for the pet's lifetime. The Pet Bereavement Support Service is a free and confidential telephone and email helpline and is available 365 days a year to help people who are struggling to cope with the loss of a pet.

Proposed closure of two animal centres and opening of two new animal centres
On 26 January 2010, Blue Cross announced the proposed closure of the two animal adoption centres (Felixstowe and Northiam, East Sussex), both of which had been in existence for over 50 years. Final decisions on both sites were announced on 4 May 2010. After an extensive publicity campaign by locals, it was announced that plans to close the Felixstowe centre had been dropped. The Felixstowe centre was relocated to a brand new purpose-built site near Ipswich, Suffolk, in 2016 and can now care for double the number of pets as the previous site was able to care for. Blue Cross also opened a new animal adoption centre in Newport, south Wales, in 2016.

Partnerships
The Irish Blue Cross is a related party of Blue Cross.

Awards
Medals have been awarded by Blue Cross to animals and people who have demonstrated bravery or heroism. While the first medals were awarded to people who helped to rescue animals, medals were awarded in 1918 to honour a number of horses which had served in the First World War. Medals were then given out between 1940 and 1951 to a number of dogs, including Juliana who reportedly extinguished an incendiary bomb by urinating on it. In 2006 Jake, a police explosives dog, was given the honour after helping to clear out the London Underground after the 7 July 2005 London bombings. In 2017, Staffordshire bull terrier Romeo received the Blue Cross Medal for being a therapy dog for stroke victims and dementia sufferers and donating blood.

References

External links

1897 establishments in the United Kingdom
Animal charities based in the United Kingdom
Animal rescue groups
Animal welfare organisations based in the United Kingdom
Organisations based in Oxfordshire
Organizations established in 1897
Pets in the United Kingdom
West Oxfordshire District